Jeremy Roberts may refer to:
 Jeremy Roberts (footballer), English footballer
 Jeremy Dale Roberts, English composer and teacher
 Jeremy Roberts (politician), Canadian politician